The 2017 Engie Open de Biarritz was a professional tennis tournament played on outdoor clay courts. It was the fifteenth edition of the tournament and was part of the 2017 ITF Women's Circuit. It took place in Biarritz, France, on 11–17 September 2017.

Singles main draw entrants

Seeds 

 1 Rankings as of 28 August 2017.

Other entrants 
The following players received a wildcard into the singles main draw:
  Loudmilla Bencheikh
  Alizé Lim
  Jessika Ponchet
  Virginie Razzano

The following players received entry from the qualifying draw:
  Audrey Albié
  Yvonne Cavallé Reimers
  Mallaurie Noël
  Chiara Scholl

Champions

Singles

 Mihaela Buzărnescu def.  Patty Schnyder, 6–4, 6–3

Doubles
 
 Irina Bara /  Mihaela Buzărnescu def.  Cristina Bucșa /  Isabelle Wallace, 6–3, 6–1

External links 
 2017 Engie Open de Biarritz at ITFtennis.com
 Official website

2017 ITF Women's Circuit
2017 in French tennis
Open de Biarritz